Birkenfeld is a Verbandsgemeinde ("collective municipality") in the district of Birkenfeld, in Rhineland-Palatinate, Germany. The seat of the Verbandsgemeinde is in Birkenfeld.

The Verbandsgemeinde Birkenfeld consists of the following Ortsgemeinden ("local municipalities"):

References

Verbandsgemeinde in Rhineland-Palatinate